A marsquake is a quake which, much like an earthquake, would be a shaking of the surface or interior of the planet Mars as a result of the sudden release of energy in the planet's interior, such as the result of plate tectonics, which most quakes on Earth originate from, or possibly from hotspots such as Olympus Mons or the Tharsis Montes. The detection and analysis of marsquakes could be informative to probing the interior structure of Mars, as well as identifying whether any of Mars's many volcanoes continue to be volcanically active.

Quakes have been observed and well-documented on the Moon, and there is evidence of past quakes on Venus. However, marsquakes were not definitely observed until 2019.  Compelling evidence has been found that Mars has in the past been seismically more active, with clear magnetic striping over a large region of southern Mars.  Magnetic striping on Earth is often a sign of a region of particularly thin crust splitting and spreading, forming new land in the slowly separating rifts; a prime example of this being the Mid-Atlantic Ridge.  However, no clear spreading ridge has been found in this region, suggesting that another, possibly non-seismic explanation may be needed.

The first confirmed seismic event emanating from Valles Marineris, a quake with a magnitude of 4.2, was detected by InSight on 25 August 2021, proving it to be an active fault.

Detectability

The first attempts to detect seismic activity on Mars were with the Viking program in 1975, and although the landers were operated for several years, the seismographs were mounted on top of the landers and were unable to detect any clear seismic activity due to the Martian wind blowing them too much. It was possible to rule out frequent and large marsquakes at that time. The Viking 2 device collected data for 2100 hours (89 days) of data over 560 sols of lander runtime. The Viking 1 lander did not return any data due to a problem activating the seismometer.  Times when the windspeed was low at the Viking 2 site, allowed limits to be placed on seismic activity at the time and place on Mars.

There was one candidate for a Mars quake on Sol 80 by the Viking 2 seismometer.  However, there was no wind speed data, so it's not possible to say whether it was the wind or not. Much of data set has been converted to ASCII files from the original recordings.  Thirty years later, data from the InSight mission led to an increased interest in the Viking data set, and further analysis may reveal one of the largest collection of Mars dust devil detections.

The InSight Mars lander, launched in May 2018, landed on Mars on 26 November 2018 and deployed a seismometer called Seismic Experiment for Interior Structure (SEIS) on 19 December 2018 to search for marsquakes and analyze Mars's internal structure. Even if no seismic events are detected, the seismometer is expected to be sensitive enough to detect possibly several dozen meteors causing airbursts in Mars's atmosphere per year, as well as meteorite impacts. It will also investigate how the Martian crust and mantle respond to the effects of meteorite impacts, which gives clues to the planet's inner structure.

A faint seismic signal, believed to be a small marsquake, was measured and recorded by the InSight lander on 6 April 2019. The lander's seismometer detected ground vibrations while three distinct kinds of sounds were recorded, according to NASA. Three other events were recorded on 14 March, 10 April, and 11 April, but these signals were even smaller and more ambiguous in origin, making it difficult to determine their cause.

On 4 May 2022, a large marsquake, estimated at magnitude 5, was detected by the seismometer on the InSight lander.

Candidate Natural Seismic Events
Despite the drawbacks of significant wind interference, on Sol 80 of the Viking 2 lander's mission (roughly November 23, 1976), the on-board seismometer detected an unusual acceleration event during a period of relatively low wind speed. Based on the features of the signal and assuming Mars's crust behaves similar to Earth's crust near the lander's testing site in Southern California, the event was estimated to have a magnitude of 2.7 and a distance of roughly 110 kilometers. However, the wind speed was only measured 20 minutes previously, and 45 minutes after, at 2.6 and 3.6 meters per second, respectively. While a sudden wind gust of 16 m/s would have been required to produce the event, it cannot be completely ruled out.

On Sol 128 of the InSight lander mission the Seismic Experiment for Interior Structure (SEIS) detected one magnitude 1-2 seismic event on April 6, 2019. Three other unconfirmed candidate seismic events were detected on March 14, April 10 and April 11, 2019. The quake is similar to moonquakes detected during the Apollo program. It could have been caused by activity internal to the planet or by a meteorite striking the surface. The epicenter was believed to be within 100 km of the lander. As of 30 September 2019, SEIS had reported 450 events of various types.

Experimental (Artificial) Seismic Events
NASA's Mars Perseverance Rover will act as a seismic source of known temporal and spatial localization as it lands on the surface. The InSight lander will evaluate whether the signals produced by this event will be detectable by 3,452 km away.

See also
 Seismic Experiment for Interior Structure (SEIS, instrument on InSight Mars lander)
 Tectonics of Mars
 Volcanology of Mars

References

External links
  NASA (19 July 2019)

Tectonics
Geology of Mars
Planetary science
Seismology